WQRC (99.9 FM; "99.9 The Q") is a radio station broadcasting a hot adult contemporary format. Licensed to Barnstable, Massachusetts, United States, the station serves the Cape Cod region.  The station is currently owned by Sandab Communications Limited Partnership II, doing business as CCB Media (Cape Cod Broadcasting Media) and features programming from AP Radio & Westwood One.

Programming
99.9 The Q serves the adult population in the Cape Cod radio market, and has done so since 1970.  The Q features hot adult contemporary music. The current air staff line-up includes Suzanne Tonaire, Cheryl Park, Rebecca Romo, plus weekend host Steve Marcus. It is also an affiliate of “The Daly Download with Carson Daly”. Prior to 2014, the station was known for decades as "99.9 WQRC" before gradually phasing it out in favor of the current "99-9 The Q" branding.

History

Former personalities
Francis Broadhurst

References

External links

QRC
Barnstable, Massachusetts
Hot adult contemporary radio stations in the United States
Radio stations established in 1970
1970 establishments in Massachusetts